Bengbu is a city in northern Anhui Province, China. Its population was 3,296,408 registered residents at the 2020 census. 1,968,027 lived in the built-up area made of four Bengbu urban districts and Fengyang County in Chuzhou Prefecture, largely being conurbated. Its name means "Clam Wharf" in Chinese, echoing its former reputation as a freshwater pearl fishery.

Administration
The prefecture-level city of Bengbu administers seven county-level divisions, including four districts and three counties.

These are further divided into 74 township-level divisions, including 36 towns, 19 townships and 19 subdistricts.

Geography
Bengbu is located in the southeast of the North China Plain, on the Huai River. The built up urbanized area is divided into two parts: greater Bengbu on the south bank of the river and little Bengbu on the north bank. Dragon Lake is on the East side of the urbanized area. On the other side of the lake is the university district, containing four institutions of higher learning.

Climate
The area has a four-season humid subtropical climate with strong monsoon influences (Köppen climate classification Cwa), cool, sometimes cold, winters, and hot and humid summers. The area lies in a climatic transition zone, as it is on the Qin Ling−Huai River boundary between the climatic regimes of northern and southern China. A majority of the annual precipitation occurs from June to August. With monthly percent possible sunshine ranging from 44% in March to 56% in August, the city receives 2,168 hours of bright sunshine annually.

History

In ancient times, the Dongyi peoples inhabited this area and were collectively known as the Huaiyi after the Huai River. During the late Western Zhou Period and the early Spring and Autumn period, the Dongyi became increasingly sinicized. During the late Spring and Autumn period, the once-powerful Dongyi state of Xu was pressured from all directions and destroyed through a series of wars with its neighbors, such as the Chu State and the Wu State. Another Dongyi State was the small Zhongli State, which was a part of the Huaiyi Confederation led by the State of Xu. Tombs belonging to the royalty of the Zhongli State were discovered in excavations between 2005 and 2008 near Fengyang. Eventually, the Huaiyi peoples were assimilated.

Bengbu has always been a hub of water and land communications in Anhui province, and a major distribution centre for the Huai basin.

In 1948, during the Chinese Civil War, the Communist People's Liberation Army won a decisive victory over Chiang Kai-shek's Nationalist (KMT) forces near Bengbu, in the Huaihai Campaign.

Economy

Industry
Bengbu is now a famous food city in Anhui province. Food-related industries account for 44% of the city's industrial production. The city's other industries include engineering works, textiles, glass making, chemicals, and electronics. The light textile holds an important position in the industrial structure.

Agriculture
Bengbu is teeming with oil, vegetables, meat and aquatic products. Bengbu is a large producer of peanuts. The pomegranates from Huaiyuan (a county of Bengbu), have a high reputation in China. In Wuhe (a county of Bengbu), the crabs are also famous.

Culture
Pollution in the village of Qiugang, a suburb of Bengbu, was the subject of the 2010 film The Warriors of Qiugang, an 83rd Academy Awards nominee. The Bengbu Stadium is located in the city. The 15,000-capacity stadium is used mostly for football matches.

Food
Bengbu cuisine, along with northern Anhui cuisine, is similar to cuisine from nearby Henan and Shandong provinces, as well as Xuzhou cuisine in northern Jiangsu province.

Transportation

The city is on the Jinghu Railway, with hourly direct trains to Beijing, Shanghai and other large cities. Bengbu South Railway Station is served by the high-speed Beijing-Shanghai Railway.

Bengbu Airport, which was relocated from the city's central urban area around the turn of the 21st century, is now operated only as a military airport. A new commercial airport is under construction in the district north of the Huai river.

Construction on the Bengbu Metro started in 2019 and is due to be completed in 2023.

Colleges and universities
 Anhui University of Finance and Economics
 Bengbu Medical College
 Bengbu College
 Bengbu Tank College (Army)
 Thirteenth Flying Academy (Air Force)

Twinnings 
  Bergamo, Lombardy, Italy, since 1988
  Settsu, Osaka, Japan
  Tameside, Greater Manchester, United Kingdom
  Szolnok, Hungary,

See also

References

External links
Government website of Bengbu (in Simplified Chinese)

 
Cities in Anhui
Prefecture-level divisions of Anhui